Denis Meloche (born June 19, 1952) is a Canadian former professional ice hockey player who played in the World Hockey Association (WHA). Drafted in the ninth round of the 1972 NHL Amateur Draft by the California Golden Seals, Meloche opted to play in the WHA after being selected by the Miami Screaming Eagles in the WHA General Player Draft. He played parts of two seasons for the Blazers franchise — which had moved from Miami before their inaugural season — in Philadelphia and Vancouver. Aside from a nine-game stint with the Maine Mariners of the American Hockey League (AHL) he spent his final four professional seasons with the Salt Lake Golden Eagles of the Central Hockey League, where he was named a CHL Second Team All-Star in 1974–75.

As a youth, Meloche played in the 1963 and 1964 Quebec International Pee-Wee Hockey Tournaments with teammates Rick Lalonde and Rychard Campeau on minor ice hockey from Saint-Jean-de-Matha, Quebec and Ville-Émard in Montréal, and then also played in the 1965 tournament with Ville-Émard. Meloche's brother, Gilles Meloche, and nephew, Éric Meloche, both played in the National Hockey League.

Career statistics

References

External links

1952 births
California Golden Seals draft picks
Canadian ice hockey centres
Drummondville Rangers players
Living people
Maine Mariners players
Philadelphia Blazers players
Roanoke Valley Rebels (EHL) players
Roanoke Valley Rebels (SHL) players
Salt Lake Golden Eagles (CHL) players
Ice hockey people from Montreal
Vancouver Blazers players
Canadian expatriate ice hockey players in the United States